German submarine U-828 was a Type VIIC/41 U-boat of Nazi Germany's Kriegsmarine during the Second World War. She saw no combat and was scuttled at the end of the war.

U-828 was ordered on 8 June 1942 and laid down on 16 August 1943 at Schichau-Werke, Danzig, West Prussia. She was launched on 16 March 1944 and commissioned on 17 June with Oberleutnant zur See Alfred John in command. John remained in command for the remainder of the war. The U-boat saw no action and was scuttled on 5 May 1945 west of Wesermünde, near Bremerhaven in position .

Design
Like all Type VIIC/41 U-boats, U-828 had a displacement of  when at the surface and  while submerged.

U-828 was fitted with five  torpedo tubes (four fitted at the bow and one at the stern), fourteen torpedoes, one  SK C/35 naval gun, (220 rounds), one  Flak M42 and two  C/30 anti-aircraft guns. Her complement was between forty-four and sixty.

References

Bibliography

External links

German Type VIIC/41 submarines
U-boats commissioned in 1944
1944 ships
World War II submarines of Germany
Ships built in Danzig
Ships built by Schichau
Operation Regenbogen (U-boat)
Maritime incidents in May 1945